Sharon Glenn is a South African international lawn bowler.

Bowls career
Glenn has represented South Africa at the Commonwealth Games, in the pairs event (with Jill Hackland) at the 1998 Commonwealth Games.

She won a pairs gold medal with Esme Steyn, at the 2005 Atlantic Bowls Championships in Bangor.

In 2012, she finished runner-up to Esme Steyn in the singles at the South African National Bowls Championships.

References

South African female bowls players
Living people
Bowls players at the 1998 Commonwealth Games
Year of birth missing (living people)